The 12th Jungle Cazadores Company (Spanish: Compañía de Cazadores de Monte 12) is a unit of the Argentine Army specialized in jungle warfare. This company is part of the 12th Bush Brigade, and is based in Puerto Iguazú, province of Misiones.

See also
Jungle warfare
Cazadores de Monte

External links 
 Official website
 Organization and equipment
 Argentine Infantry Official website

Army units and formations of Argentina